Crillon may refer to:

People
 Louis des Balbes de Berton de Crillon

Places

 Hôtel de Crillon, a hotel in Paris

Crillon is the name or part of the name of several communes in France:
 Crillon, Oise, in the Oise département
 Crillon-le-Brave, in the Vaucluse département
 Cape Crillon, the southernmost point of Sakhalin, in Russia.
 Crillon Tours, DMC and largest Tour Operator in Bolivia

mg:Crillon